Aniba venezuelana is a species of plant in the family Lauraceae. It is found in Colombia, Costa Rica, and Venezuela.

References

venezuelana
Least concern plants
Taxonomy articles created by Polbot